Rutan-Terhune-Bidwell House is located in Paramus, Bergen County, New Jersey, United States. The house was added to the National Register of Historic Places on February 28, 1996.

See also
National Register of Historic Places listings in Bergen County, New Jersey

References

Houses on the National Register of Historic Places in New Jersey
Houses in Bergen County, New Jersey
Paramus, New Jersey
National Register of Historic Places in Bergen County, New Jersey
New Jersey Register of Historic Places